The 2004 Pan American Individual Event Artistic Gymnastics Championships were held in Maracaibo, Venezuela, December 1–05, 2004.

Medal summary

Medalists

Medal table

References

2004 in gymnastics
Pan American Gymnastics Championships
International gymnastics competitions hosted by Venezuela
2004 in Venezuelan sport